Curfew is a 2012 American short film directed by Shawn Christensen. The film won the Oscar for Best Live Action Short Film at the 85th Academy Awards.

The short is the basis for a feature film which premiered at SXSW 2014 titled Before I Disappear.

Plot
Richie is in the process of ending his life in a bathtub when he gets a call from his estranged sister, Maggie, asking him to look after his niece, Sophia, for the night. Richie cancels his plans and sets out to babysit his niece.

When he meets Sophia, she makes it clear that she has no interest in talking to him, nor does she seem to care much about him. Richie mentions that he drew flipbooks when he was younger, starring a protagonist named "Sophia", and that he wonders if his sister got Sophia’s name from those flipbooks. He then takes Sophia to an old rundown building where he used to live, and finds the flipbooks he wants to show her, but Sophia gets scared and wants to go home.

After Richie apologizes, they return to the bowling alley and Sophia starts asking all about his life. They start to become friends, and Richie admits that the reason he hasn't been allowed to see her all these years is because he once dropped Sophia on her head while taking care of her as a baby. Sophia finds this incident amusing, just as her favorite song comes on over the loudspeakers. Suddenly, everyone in the bowling alley seems to be dancing along with the song, except for Richie. Sophia begs him to dance with her, tugging at his arm until his wrist comes out of its sleeve, revealing his suicide attempt. Richie snaps back to reality.

When Richie brings Sophia back home, he notices a restraining order sitting on the kitchen table, citing assault and harassment. His sister comes back looking bruised and she thanks Richie for his help, but she wants him to leave. She doesn’t want her daughter having any more "false idols". Richie tells her how much he looked up to her when they were younger, and how much he still looks up to her now. He returns home to his bathtub, and attempts to continue what he started in the beginning but Maggie interrupts him with a phone call again, this time on nicer terms.

Awards

Release
The film was released in February 2013 on iTunes and in a theatrical run with the other 14 Oscar-nominated short films by ShortsHD.

References

External links
 
 

2012 films
Indiegogo projects
Live Action Short Film Academy Award winners
2012 short films
2012 drama films
2010s English-language films
American drama short films
Films directed by Shawn Christensen
2010s American films